An activity book is a type of book, generally aimed at children, which contains interactive content such as games, puzzles, quizzes, pictures to colour and other elements that involve writing or drawing in the book itself. The book may, or may not, have a loose narrative or contain other non-interactive elements structured around the interactive elements. Activity books may be made for entertainment, education or a mixture of both.

Specific types of activity books include colouring books and puzzle books. A book is normally referred to as an activity book if it combines a variety of interactive elements and does not fall neatly into one of these more specific categories.

Examples 
Activity books are typically centred around a particular theme. This may be a generic theme, e.g. dinosaurs, or based on a toy, television show, book, or game.

For example, the Where's Wally? series of books (known as Where's Waldo? in the USA) by Martin Handford consists of both puzzle books, wherein the reader must search for characters hidden in pictures, and activity books such as Where's Waldo?: The Ultimate Fun Book, which include a wider range of games and activities as well as puzzles. In 2018, Nintendo announced its intention to publish activity books based on its trademarked characters and games. Other franchises for which a number of activity books are available include:

 Books by Julia Donaldson
 Diary of a Wimpy Kid series by Jeff Kinney
 LEGO
 DC Comics
 Marvel
 Cbeebies television shows, e.g. Abney and Teal
 Horrible Histories series by Terry Deary

External links

References 

Book terminology
Children's books
Library science
Books by type